The Rainbow Cheetah XLS is a light sport aircraft developed from the Rainbow Aircraft Cheetah

Design
The Cheetah XLS is a two-place side-by-side strut braced high-wing monoplane with tricycle landing gear. The fuselage is constructed of aluminum tubing with fabric covering. The aircraft is configured for a Rotax 582, Rotax 912UL, Rotax 912ULS, or Jabiru 2200 engine installation.

Specifications (Cheetah XLS)

See also

References

Light-sport aircraft